Lukáš Rosol was the defending champion but chose not to compete.

Norbert Gombos won the tournament defeating Albert Montañés in the final, 7–6(7–5), 5–7, 7–6(7–2).

Seeds

  João Souza (first round)
  Norbert Gombos (champion)
  Kimmer Coppejans (semifinals)
  Aleksandr Nedovyesov (semifinals)
  André Ghem (second round)
  Albert Montañés (final)
  Gerald Melzer (first round)
  Íñigo Cervantes (quarterfinals)

Draw

Finals

Top half

Bottom half

References
 Main Draw
 Qualifying Draw

Sparta Prague Open - Singles
2015 Singles